Lars Schenk (born 16 January 2002) is a Dutch professional footballer who plays as a left-back for Eerste Divisie club MVV.

Career
Schenk started playing football with Geulsche Boys alongside his nephew and future MVV teammate, Tim Zeegers. Both joined the MVV academy later on. On 12 December 2020, Schenk first appeared in MVV's matchday squad in their Eerste Divisie tie against FC Eindhoven, remaining as an unused substitute in the 4–0 loss. 

He made his professional debut on 29 January 2022 in another league match against FC Eindhoven, replacing the injured Mitchel Keulen in the 21st minute of a 1–0 loss. Eleven first-team players were sidelined that day in the midst of the COVID-19 pandemic in the Netherlands. He made his first start the following matchday in a 5–0 loss to local rivals VVV-Venlo on 4 February, and continued as a starter the following games due to Keulen's injury.

On 26 June 2022, Schenk signed his first professional contract, a two-year deal, keeping him at MVV until 2024.

Career statistics

References

External links
 

2002 births
Living people
People from Meerssen
Dutch footballers
Association football fullbacks
MVV Maastricht players
Eerste Divisie players
Footballers from Limburg (Netherlands)